Iulian Adrian Vladu (born 2 February 1982 in Caracal) is a Romanian footballer who plays as a defender for Muscelul Câmpulung.

Notes 
 The 2008–2009 and 2009–2010 Liga II appearances and goals made for CS Mioveni are unavailable.

External links

1982 births
Living people
People from Caracal, Romania
Romanian footballers
Association football midfielders
FC Politehnica Iași (2010) players
CS Mioveni players
CS Șoimii Pâncota players
FC Argeș Pitești players
Liga I players
Liga II players